Corymorpha is a genus of hydrozoans in the family Corymorphidae.

Species
The genus contains the following species:
 Corymorpha abaxialis (Kramp, 1962)
 Corymorpha annulata (Kramp, 1928)
 Corymorpha anthoformis (Yamada, Konno & Kubota, 1974)
 Corymorpha apiciloculifera (Xu & Huang, 2003)
 Corymorpha bigelowi (Maas, 1905)
 Corymorpha brunnescentis (Huang, 1999)
 Corymorpha cargoi (Vargas-Hernandez & Ochoa-Figueroa, 1991)
 Corymorpha carnea (Clark, 1876)
 Corymorpha crassocanalis (Xu & Huang, 2003)
 Corymorpha forbesii (Mayer, 1894)
 Corymorpha fujianensis (Xu & Huang, 2006)
 Corymorpha furcata (Kramp, 1948)
 Corymorpha gemmifera (Bouillon, 1978)
 Corymorpha gigantea (Kramp, 1957)
 Corymorpha glacialis M. Sars, 1860
 Corymorpha gracilis (Brooks, 1883)
 Corymorpha groenlandica (Allman, 1876)
 Corymorpha interogona (Xu & Huang, 2003)
 Corymorpha januarii Steenstrup, 1855
 Corymorpha juliephillipsi (Gershwin, Zeidler & Davie, 2010)
 Corymorpha knides (Huang, 1999)
 Corymorpha macrobulbus (Xu & Huang, 2003)
 Corymorpha meijiensis (Xu, Huang & Guo, 2013)
 Corymorpha microrhiza (Hickson & Gravely, 1907)
 Corymorpha multiknoba (Xu, Huang & Guo, 2014)
 Corymorpha nana Alder, 1857
 Corymorpha nanhainesis (Huang, Xu & Ling, 2012)
 Corymorpha normani (Browne, 1916)
 Corymorpha nutans M. Sars, 1835
 Corymorpha palma Torrey, 1902
 Corymorpha pendula L. Agassiz, 1862
 Corymorpha pileiformis (Xu, Huang & Guo, 2014)
 Corymorpha pseudoabaxialis (Bouillon, 1978)
 Corymorpha rubicincta Watson, 2008
 Corymorpha russelli (Hamond, 1974)
 Corymorpha sagamina Hirohito, 1988
 Corymorpha sarsii Steenstrup, 1855
 Corymorpha similis (Kramp, 1959)
 Corymorpha solidonema (Huang, 1999)
 Corymorpha symmetrica Hargitt, 1924
 Corymorpha taiwanensis (Xu & Huang, 2003)
 Corymorpha typica (Uchida, 1927)
 Corymorpha uvularis (Fraser, 1943)
 Corymorpha vacuola (Xu, Huang & Guo, 2012)
 Corymorpha valdiviae (Vanhöffen, 1911)
 Corymorpha verrucosa (Bouillon, 1978)

References

Corymorphidae
Hydrozoan genera